Abigail Gloud (born ) is a retired Trinidad and Tobago female volleyball and beach volleyball player, playing as a s. She was part of the Trinidad and Tobago women's national volleyball team.

She participated at the 2011 Women's Pan-American Volleyball Cup.

References

External links

1987 births
Living people
Trinidad and Tobago women's volleyball players
Place of birth missing (living people)
Trinidad and Tobago beach volleyball players